The Kindergarten Teacher is a 2014 film by Israeli writer and film director Nadav Lapid.

Reception
The site's critical consensus reads, "The Kindergarten Teachers crypticness can needlessly feel like homework, but Nadav Lapid's provocative direction and committed performances give this tale of mentorship and possession a disquieting sting". On Metacritic, the film has the weighted average score of 68 out of 100 based on 12 critic reviews, indicating "generally favorable reviews".
	
The New York Times called it, "self-assured, remarkably powerful".

Accolades
The Kindergarten Teacher won the $20,000 prize for new talent at the Taipei Film Festival. Lead actress Sarit Larry received the IFFI Best Actor Award (Female): Silver Peacock Award at the 45th International Film Festival of India.

Remake
The film was remade in 2018 as the English-language film The Kindergarten Teacher.

References

External links
 
 The Kindergarten Teacher at Cinema of Israel
 The Kindergarten Teacher at Cineuropa

Israeli drama films
Films about poets
2014 drama films
Films directed by Nadav Lapid
2010s Hebrew-language films